McDonald Lake is a small alpine lake in Custer County, Idaho, United States, located in the Sawtooth Valley in the Sawtooth National Recreation Area. The lake is very shallow and about half of it is a shallow wetland due to sedimentation.

McDonald Lake can be accessed from State Highway 75 via Sawtooth National Forest road 205 and 096. Forest road 096 is a high clearance road that goes directly to a trailhead and campground on the shores of Yellow Belly Lake, which is just downstream of McDonald Lake.

References

See also
 List of lakes of the Sawtooth Mountains (Idaho)
 Sawtooth National Forest
 Sawtooth National Recreation Area
 Sawtooth Range (Idaho)

Lakes of Idaho
Lakes of Custer County, Idaho
Glacial lakes of the United States
Glacial lakes of the Sawtooth National Forest